This page indexes the individual year in Scottish television pages.

2020s - 2010s - 2000s - 1990s - 1980s - 1970s - 1960s - 1950s

2020s
2023 in Scottish television
2022 in Scottish television
2021 in Scottish television
2020 in Scottish television

2010s
2019 in Scottish television
2018 in Scottish television
2017 in Scottish television
2016 in Scottish television
2015 in Scottish television
2014 in Scottish television
2013 in Scottish television
2012 in Scottish television
2011 in Scottish television
2010 in Scottish television

2000s
2009 in Scottish television
2008 in Scottish television
2007 in Scottish television
2006 in Scottish television
2005 in Scottish television
2004 in Scottish television
2003 in Scottish television
2002 in Scottish television
2001 in Scottish television
2000 in Scottish television

1990s
1999 in Scottish television
1998 in Scottish television
1997 in Scottish television
1996 in Scottish television
1995 in Scottish television
1994 in Scottish television
1993 in Scottish television
1992 in Scottish television
1991 in Scottish television
1990 in Scottish television

1980s
1989 in Scottish television
1988 in Scottish television
1987 in Scottish television
1986 in Scottish television
1985 in Scottish television
1984 in Scottish television
1983 in Scottish television
1982 in Scottish television
1981 in Scottish television
1980 in Scottish television

1970s
1979 in Scottish television
1978 in Scottish television
1977 in Scottish television
1976 in Scottish television
1975 in Scottish television
1974 in Scottish television
1973 in Scottish television
1972 in Scottish television
1971 in Scottish television
1970 in Scottish television

1960s
1969 in Scottish television
1968 in Scottish television
1967 in Scottish television
1966 in Scottish television
1965 in Scottish television
1964 in Scottish television
1963 in Scottish television
1962 in Scottish television
1961 in Scottish television
1960 in Scottish television

1950s
1959 in Scottish television
1958 in Scottish television
1957 in Scottish television
1956 in Scottish television
1955 in Scottish television
1954 in Scottish television
1953 in Scottish television
1952 in Scottish television

See also
 List of years in television

Television
Television in Scotland
Scottish